The New England Review is an American quarterly literary magazine published by Middlebury College. It was established in 1978 by Sydney Lea and Jay Parini. From 1982 till 1990, the magazine was named New England Review & Bread Loaf Quarterly, reverting to its original name in 1991. It publishes poetry, fiction, translations, and nonfiction.

The New England Review Award for Emerging Writers provides a full scholarship to the Bread Loaf Writers' Conference for an emerging writer in any genre, who offers an unusual and compelling new voice and who has been published in that year by the magazine. The awardee is selected by the editorial staff and the director of the conference.

See also
Bread Loaf School of English

References

External links

Poetry magazines published in the United States
Quarterly magazines published in the United States
English-language magazines
Magazines established in 1978
Middlebury College
Magazines published in Vermont
1978 establishments in Vermont